General López may refer to:

Estanislao López (1786–1838), Argentine brigadier general in the Argentine War of Independence
Javier López (general) (1794–1836), Argentine general
José Hilario López (1798–1869), Colombian general
Lester Martínez López (born 1955), U.S. Army major general
Nicolás Lindley López (1908–1995), Peruvian Army general
Vladimir Padrino López (born 1963), Venezuelan Army four-star general

See also
Antonio López de Santa Anna (1794−1876), Mexican general and statesman